Hello Time Bomb is a song by Canadian alternative rock group Matthew Good Band. It was released in September 1999 as the lead single from their third studio album, Beautiful Midnight. It was nominated for Best Single at the 2000 Juno Awards and is one of the band's signature songs. Between 1995 and 2016, Hello Time Bomb was the fourth most played song by a Canadian artist on rock radio stations in Canada.

Song information
Good mentions that he wrote the song quickly on an old acoustic guitar at a friend's place.

{{Quotation|1=
Sometimes the unexpected happens. Years ago I had a day off during the making of Beautiful Midnight. Two friends had dropped by my place to get me, as we were going out. While sitting there, we somehow got into a discussion about writing quick songs about nothing. So I picked up this crappy old classical guitar that belonged to my ex-girlfriend and proceeded to play do-do-do-do-do…click-click-click-click-click-click-click-click-click-click-click-click-click-click…do-do-do-do-do. And then the words came - 'I found me a reason, so check me tomorrow, we’ll see if I’m leaking, push and push and push till it hurts…'In about 45 minutes I had what would basically be Hello Time Bomb, which later that night I quickly recorded onto a cassette and we tracked the very next day.Sometimes the unexpected happens.Of course, never in my wildest dreams did I think that that song would go on to become one of my biggest singles. I mean let’s face it, I wrote it on a dust covered classical guitar that had been sitting unused behind a large plant for years. But, in the end, that’s how it happened.|author=Matthew Good}}

Charts

Weekly charts

 Year-end charts 

Trivia
The song is featured on MuchMusic's compilation album, Big Shiny Tunes 4.
In a 2009 list of the "Top 200 songs of the 1990s" by CFNY-FM (102.1 "The Edge"), "Hello Time Bomb" was voted #35.
The song is featured on the soundtrack of the 2002 film Men with Brooms''.
Todd Kerns from The Age of Electric is a featured background vocalist in the song.

References

External links

1999 singles
Matthew Good Band songs
1999 songs
Universal Records singles
Songs written by Dave Genn
Songs written by Matthew Good